The Prophet River is a river in northern British Columbia, Canada. It is a tributary of the Muskwa River.

The Prophet River Hotsprings Provincial Park is established on the upper course, and the Prophet River Wayside Provincial Park is located along the middle course of the river. It gives the name to the settlement of Prophet River, British Columbia, as well as the Prophet Formation, a stratigraphic unit of the Western Canadian Sedimentary Basin.

Course
It flows eastwards between the Northern Rocky Mountains Provincial Park and the Redfern-Keily Provincial Park, with occasional waterfalls on its course. The remote Prophet River Hotsprings Provincial Park is established on the upper course of the river. It receives the waters from Hewer Creek north of Mount Boe, then from Kravac Creek and Richards Creek towards the foothills. North of Klingzut Mountain it receives the Besa River just before flowing from the mountains into the plains

The Milliken Creek and Bat Creek flow into the Prophet River east of the Rocky Mountains. The course changes towards north-east, as it receives water from Minaker River, Bunch Creek, Dethseda Creek, Chipesia Creek and Sass Creek. The river turns north as it flows through the Prophet River Wayside Provincial Park, and is followed by the Alaska Highway for a while. Streams that flow into the river in this section include the Bougie Creek, Adsett Creek, Jacknife Creek, Parker Creek and Little Beaver Creek as it flows through the Sikanni Forest. The course becomes meandered, and the Tenaka Creek, Big Beaver Creek, Cheves Creek, Tsachehdza Creek and Jackfish Creek flow into the Prophet River.

The Muskwa River flows into the Fort Nelson River, a tributary of the Liard River, which carries the waters into the Mackenzie River and ultimately in the Arctic Ocean.

Tributaries
 Hewer Creek
 Kravac Creek 
 Richards Creek
 Besa River
 Milliken Creek
 Bat Creek
 Minaker River
 Bunch Creek
 Dethseda Creek
 Chipesia Creek
 Sass Creek
 Bougie Creek
 Adsett Creek
 Jacknife Creek
 Parker Creek
 Little Beaver Creek
 Tenaka Creek
 Big Beaver Creek
 Cheves Creek
 Tsachehdza Creek 
 Jackfish Creek

References

Prophet River
Fort Nelson Country
Peace River Land District